Samuel Spielman Griffin (January 3, 1892 – October 18, 1951) served briefly as mayor of Boise, Idaho, in 1945 and 1946.

Griffin succeeded Austin Walker, who died in office in October 1945. Griffin resigned four months later and was succeeded by former mayor H. W. Whillock.

References

Sources
Mayors of Boise - Past and Present
Idaho State Historical Society Reference Series, Corrected List of Mayors, 1867-1996

External links
Samuel S. Griffin entry at The Political Graveyard

1892 births
1951 deaths
Mayors of Boise, Idaho
20th-century American politicians
People from Tekamah, Nebraska